Ambunti-Dreikikier District (sometimes spelled Ambunti-Drekikier District) is a district of East Sepik Province in Papua New Guinea. It is one of the six administrative districts that make up the province.

April Salome Forest Management Area is located in the district.

See also
Districts of Papua New Guinea

References 

Districts of Papua New Guinea
East Sepik Province